Luca Longo is an Italian computer scientist specializing in Explainable artificial intelligence, Deep Learning and Argumentation theory with research in the areas of Human performance modeling. As the general chair of the 1st World Conference on Explainable artificial intelligence, he performs fundamental research in the area of computational models of Cognitive Load and is the editor of books and journals with Springer Publishing  and Frontiers Media . 
He is a public speaker disseminating technical knowledge to the wider public   and contributing to the non-profit organization TED (conference) "ideas worth spreading" .
 
He is the 2016  and 2021 winner of the Teaching Hero Award in Ireland 
by the National Forum for Teaching and Learning, inspiring students by creating motivating and stimulating learning environments that support the acquisition of skills and the formation of knowledge applicable in practical contexts through the mastering of the Community of inquiry  in Higher education. Longo is also an educator, striving to empower Education with the use of technology and Artificial Intelligence .

Longo is a lecturer at the Technological University Dublin in Ireland, and the co-director of The Applied Intelligence Research Centre .
He is also a principal investigator in the Ireland's National Centre for Applied Artificial Intelligence, a research leader at the Science Foundation Ireland Centre for Research Training in Machine Learning. 
He is currently leading the Artificial Intelligence and Cognitive Load research labs  at the Technological University Dublin aimed at expanding the boundaries of Artificial Intelligence and bridging the gap between machines and humans.

Longo is originally from Varese where he earned a bachelor's and master's degree in Computer Science from the University of Insubria. He continued with a master in Health informatics, one in Statistics, and a doctorate in Artificial Intelligence at Trinity College Dublin.
He later joined the Technological University Dublin where he obtained two masters in Pedagogy, one in Scholarship of teaching and learning and one in Applied E-learning.

References

External additional realiable independent sources

Year of birth missing (living people)
Living people
Italian computer scientists
University of Insubria alumni
Alumni of Trinity College Dublin
Academics of Dublin Institute of Technology
Artificial intelligence researchers